Alejandro Ávila (born Alejandro Aranda Ávila on November 24, 1973) is a Mexican telenovela actor.

Biography 
His birth name is Alejandro Aranda and his artistic name was chosen to honor his stepfather.

Filmography

Films

Television

Awards and nominations

References

External links

1964 births
Living people
Mexican male telenovela actors
Mexican male television actors
Mexican male film actors
Male actors from Guanajuato
Singers from Guanajuato
20th-century Mexican male actors
21st-century Mexican male actors
People from Salamanca, Guanajuato
20th-century Mexican male singers
21st-century Mexican male singers